Southeastern High School of Technology and Law is a public coeducational secondary school in Detroit, Michigan, United States.  It is operated by the Detroit Public Schools. DPS will resume control of Southeastern High in fall 2017.

History 

Southeastern High School opened its doors on January 2, 1917.  The school was built in a semi-rural area that had recently become a part of the city of Detroit. When the school was built, it was so removed from the central city of Detroit that it was considered to be out in the jungle, which was the origin of the school's nickname, the "Jungaleers".

Southeastern High School's enrollment following World War II was among the highest of any high school in the state. Even as recently as 2008, its enrollment was 2,428.  In 2011-2012, the school's enrollment was 790.

The school district recently changed the school's official name from Southeastern High School to Southeastern High School of Technology and Law, as its curriculum has a strong emphasis on both these areas.

Athletics

The Jungaleers compete in the Detroit Public School League (PSL) and are members of the Michigan High School Athletic Association(MHSAA).

Southeastern participates in boys' and girls' basketball, boys' and girls' cross country, football, boys' lacrosse, softball, girls' swim and dive, boys' track and field and volleyball.

Southeastern won PSL football championships in 1957, 1964, 2005, 2008 and 2009 and also in 2020.></ref>

The Jungaleers won back-to-back PSL championships in boys' basketball in 1925 and 1926, and also won championships in 1939, 1941 and 1956. More recently, Southeastern won the PSL boys basketball championship in 2011.

For the first 31 years of the MHSAA boys' basketball state championship tournament, the PSL did not participate in the tournament, and decided they would have their own tournament among the PSL high schools instead.  It wasn't until 1962 that the PSL began playing in the MHSAA boys' basketball state tournament. Since 1962, and through 2015, the PSL has won fourteen MHSAA state championships in Class A, four in Class B, one in Class C, and three in Class D, for a total of twenty-two state boys' basketball championships.

In 2011 and 2013, the Jungaleers were MHSAA boys' basketball state championship finalists.

Publications 
The school's yearbook was originally titled The Aryan, which was changed to The Amethyst in 1967.

The school's newspaper was originally the S.E. Booster, which became The Jungaleer in 1927.

Notable alumni

 Annette Beard (1961), member of the Motown singing group Martha and the Vandellas; Rock and Roll Hall of Fame inductee 
 Steve Beck (1983), NBA player with the Phoenix Suns
 William "Bull" Bullard (2002), member of the Harlem Globetrotters
 Lt. George H. Cannon (1933), first U.S. Marine in World War II to receive the Medal of Honor
 Dennis Cole (1958), film and television actor
 William Gholston (2010), NFL player with the Tampa Bay Buccaneers
 Johnathan Hankins (2010), NFL player with the Dallas Cowboys
 Betty Hutton (attended), film actress
 Don Lund (1941), MLB player with the Detroit Tigers; University of Michigan baseball head coach
 John C. Mackie (1938), former member of the United States House of Representatives
 Cyrus Mann (1975), NBA player with the Boston Celtics
 Nate Rollins (1980), NBA player with the Kansas City Kings
 Bart Scott (1998), NFL player with the New York Jets
 Ralph Simpson (attended), NBA player with the Chicago Bulls
 Henry Washington (1975), MLB player with the Detroit Tigers

References 
Al Hudson (1968) of Al Hudson and One Way

External links

 Southeastern High School
 Southeastern High School (archive)

Public high schools in Michigan
High schools in Detroit
Educational institutions established in 1917
1917 establishments in Michigan